Jack Lynch (1917–1999) was an Irish politician.

Jack Lynch may also refer to:

Jack Lynch (rugby league) (1900–1966), Australian rugby league footballer
Jack Lynch (baseball) (1857–1923), baseball player
Jack Lynch (ice hockey) (born 1952), Canadian ice hockey player
Jack Lynch (West Adelaide footballer) (1929–2018), Australian rules footballer for West Adelaide
Jack Lynch (footballer, born 1905) (1905–1979), Australian rules footballer for North Melbourne
Jack Lynch (footballer, born 1918) (1918–1944), Australian rules footballer for Geelong
Jack Lynch (footballer, born 1995), English footballer
Jack Lynch, mass murderer during the 1840s of the Berrima District who was later hanged at the Berrima Gaol in 1842
John J. "Jack" Lynch, database systems project manager and candidate in the United States House of Representatives elections in Michigan, 2010

See also 
Jack Lynch Tunnel, Cork, Ireland
John Lynch (disambiguation)